Kings Ferry may refer to:

The Kings Ferry, a bus and coach operator in Kent, UK
Kings Ferry, Florida, a small town in the United States